Gabb is a surname. Notable people with the surname include:

David Baker-Gabb, Australian ornithologist
George Gabb (1928–2007), Belizean artist, sculptor, writer and entertainer
Harry Gabb (1909–1995), British musician
Moses Gabb (1882–1951), Australian politician
Sean Gabb (born 1960), English libertarian and conservative
William More Gabb (1839–1878), American paleontologist

See also
Gabb's snail (Micrarionta gabbii), a species of gastropod in the family Helminthoglyptidae
Gab (disambiguation)